James Flaherty may refer to:
 James A. Flaherty, Supreme Knight of the Knights of Columbus
 James Louis Flaherty, American Catholic bishop
 Jim Flaherty, Canadian politician